State Route 256 is a short highway in central Utah that serves Redmond. There are no junctions with any state highways along SR-256 besides the termini.

Route description
From its southern terminus north of Salina, SR-257 heads north from US-89, heading toward Redmond. Afterwards, it returns to US-89 south of Axtell, forming a 180-degree loop around US-89.

History
The road from Salina to Axtell via Redmond was added to the state highway system in 1910, and became part of SR-11 and US-89 in the 1920s. In 1970, after a bypass of Redmond was completed, the State Road Commission redesignated the old road as SR-256. The number was chosen so the state could use existing signs that had been removed in 1969, when the former SR-256 through Aurora (since re-added as SR-260) was deleted by the legislature.

Major intersections

References

256
 256
 256